Fabian Roth (born 29 November 1995) is a German badminton player. He started playing badminton at aged 6, and joined Germany national badminton team in 2013. He was the boys' singles gold medalist at the 2013 European Junior  Championships.

Achievements

European Junior Championships 
Boys' singles

BWF International Challenge/Series 
Men's singles

Mixed doubles

  BWF International Challenge tournament
  BWF International Series tournament
  BWF Future Series tournament

References

External links 
 

1995 births
Living people
Sportspeople from Karlsruhe
German male badminton players